The 2010 Copa Chile Bicentenario was the 31st edition of the competition. The competition started on March 27, 2010 with the preliminary rounds and concludes on December 8, 2010 with the Final. The winner qualifies for the 2011 Copa Sudamericana.

Schedule

First round
The first leg was played between May 13 and 19 May 2010, with the second legs played between May 20 and 23. The team with the most points after the two legs advanced to the next round. If both teams were equal on points, a penalty shootout took place (goal difference and away goals did not count).

Second round
The first leg was played between May 27 and June 1, with the second legs played between June 2 and 6. The team with the most points after the two legs advanced to the next round. If both teams were equal on points, a penalty shootout took place (goal difference and away goals did not count).

Third round
Played one-legged

Quarterfinals
Played one-legged

Semifinals

Final

Top goalscorers

See also
 2010 Primera División season
 Primera División B
 Tercera División A
 Tercera División B

External links
 Official site of the Copa Chile 
 Website of the Copa Chile 
 1st Round, 1st legs (Diario El Mercurio) 
 1st Round, 2nd legs (Diario El Mercurio) 
 2nd Round, 1st legs (Diario El Mercurio) 
 2nd Round, 2nd legs (Diario El Mercurio) 
 3rd Round (Diario El Mercurio) 
 Quarterfinals (Diario El Mercurio) 
 Semifinals (Diario El Mercurio) 
 Final (Diario El Mercurio) 

Chile
Copa Chile
2010